Pachychilus laevissimus is a species of freshwater snail with an operculum, an aquatic gastropod mollusk in the family Pachychilidae.

Distribution 
This species occurs in Venezuela.

References

External links 

laevisimus
Gastropods described in 1824
Molluscs of Venezuela